Custódia is a city  in the state of Pernambuco, Brazil. The population in 2020, according with IBGE was 37,375 inhabitants and the total area is 1404.1 km².

Geography

 State - Pernambuco
 Region - Sertão Pernambucano
 Boundaries - Iguaraci and Carnaíba    (N);  Floresta and Ibimirim   (S);  Sertânia   (E);   Betânia and Flores  (W).
 Area - 1404.1 km²
 Elevation - 542 m
 Hydrography - Pajeú and Moxotó rivers
 Vegetation - Caatinga  hiperxerófila
 Climate - semi arid - (Sertão) hot
 Annual average temperature - 24.0 c
 Distance to Recife - 334.4 km

Economy

The main economic activities in Custódia are based in food & beverage industry, commerce and agribusiness, especially creation of goats, sheep, cattle, pigs, horses, chickens;  and plantations of onions, beans and tomatoes.

Economic Indicators

Economy by Sector
2006

Health Indicators

References

Municipalities in Pernambuco